Denmark High School may refer to:

 Denmark High School (Georgia), United States
 Denmark High School (South Carolina), United States
 Denmark High School (Denmark, Wisconsin), United States
 Denmark Senior High School, Australia, previously known as Denmark High School